Faded Blue is the third studio album by American country music artist Gary Morris. It was released on April 2, 1984 via Warner Bros. Records. The album includes the singles "Between Two Fires", "Second Hand Heart" and "Baby Bye Bye".

Track listing

Personnel
Adapted from liner notes.

Eddie Bayers - drums, percussion
Jamie Brantley - acoustic guitar, electric guitar, background vocals
Steve Brantley - bass guitar, background vocals
Sonny Garrish - steel guitar
Steve Gibson - electric guitar (tracks 2, 6)
Gary Hooker - acoustic guitar, electric guitar, background vocals
John Barlow Jarvis - electric piano, piano
Gary Morris - lead vocals, background vocals
Bobby Ogdin - organ

Strings arranged and conducted by Bergen White, performed by The Nashville String Machine with Carl Gorodetzky, concertmaster.

Chart performance

References

1984 albums
Gary Morris albums
Albums produced by Jim Ed Norman
Warner Records albums